Two foot skiffs also known as ‘Balmain Bugs’ were model racing skiffs  typically raced on Sydney Harbour between the 1890s and 1950s. The model skiffs were crafted by shipwrights in their spare time. In the sports hey days the 1940s and 1950s there were up to 10 clubs at Abbotsford, Drummoyne, Balmain, North Sydney and Double Bay.

In 1956 the racing came to an end when two bookies had a disagreement and one pull out a pistol. The NSW Police shut down the racing due to this event.

The Balmain Two Foot Model Sailing Club had a big following, with spectators and families of the sailors hiring a ferry every Sunday to watch the race. Betting on the race outcome was available with bookmakers providing the odds.

References

Sources 
 
 
 

Sydney Harbour
Model boats
History of Sydney